Seo Seung-ah (born December 18, 1983) is a South Korean actress. She made her debut in the 2001 film Running Seven Dogs and TV drama series School 4. She is the older sister of Lee Chae-young. Seo is currently working as a VJ.

Personal life
Seo was in a relationship with  actor Ahn Yong-joon in 2009 but broke up after 2 years due to an unconfirmed reason. She married Jeong Jin-su on June 19, 2010.

Filmography

TV dramas
 2001: School 4

Films
 2001: Running Seven Dogs

References

External links
 Profile on Nate 
 Lee Na-young Mini Homepage on Cyworld 

Living people
1983 births
Actresses from Seoul
21st-century South Korean actresses
South Korean film actresses
South Korean television actresses